The Master of the Sienese Straus Madonna (active c. 1340 – 1360), was an Italian painter.

Biography 
He was active in Siena and is named after a depiction of a Madonna and Child donated by the Straus family to the Museum of Fine Arts, Houston.  He is considered to be the same person as Master of the Ashmolean Crucifixion.

References 

14th-century Italian painters
Sienese Straus Madonna
Painters from Siena
Year of birth uncertain